Penlee may refer to
 Penlee House - a house and art gallery in Penzance in the UK
 Penlee Point, Mousehole - a promentary near Penzance in the UK
 Penlee Point, Rame - a promentary near Plymouth in the UK
 the Penlee Quarry railway in Newlyn in the UK
 the Penlee Lifeboat Station in Newlyn in the UK
 an alternative name for the Kennington Stream in Kent in the UK